Antennablennius bifilum, the horned rockskipper, is a species of combtooth blenny found in the western Indian Ocean.

Like other similar species, its eggs are oviparous (eggs develop outside the female), and its range is from the Persian Gulf to South Africa.

References

bifilum
Fish described in 1861
Taxa named by Albert Günther